Augustus Carl Buchel (October 8, 1813 – April 15, 1864) was a German-born military officer who served in several national armies during the 1800s. During the American Civil War, he served as a colonel in the Confederate States Army.

Born in Guntersblum in 1813, he attended several military academies in his early life, including the École militaire in Paris, and he served in the French Foreign Legion in the early 1800s. Following his participation in the First Carlist War, he became a military instructor in the army of the Ottoman Empire, where he may have earned the honorary title of Pasha. In 1845, he emigrated to the Republic of Texas and served in the U.S. Army during the Mexican–American War, including as aide-de-camp to future U.S. President Zachary Taylor. At the outbreak of the Civil War, Buchel sided with the Confederate States of America and served as an officer primarily in Texas. By 1863, he had become colonel of his own cavalry regiment and was stationed in Louisiana, where he participated in the Battle of Pleasant Hill. He was mortally wounded in the battle and died several days later. He was later interred at the Texas State Cemetery, where a large stone memorial was erected in his honor. Additionally, Buchel County, an unorganized county that existed in the late 1800s, was named in his honor. Writing on him in 1940, historian Ella Lonn called him "[a] citizen of the Confederacy but a soldier of fortune if ever there was one!"

Early life and career 
Augustus Carl Büchel was born in the Rhineland town of Guntersblum on October 8, 1813. At the age of 14, he enrolled at a local military academy, and at the age of 18, he was commissioned as a second lieutenant of volunteers in the First Infantry Regiment of Hesse-Darmstadt. He later furthered his military training at the École militaire in Paris, after which he became a lieutenant in the French Foreign Legion. Büchel would serve in several national armies during his lifetime, and by the time of his death would be fluent in seven different languages. At the outbreak of the First Carlist War, he joined on the side of Maria Christina of the Two Sicilies. In 1837, he participated in the Battle of Huesca and the following year he was knighted by Maria Christina for his actions during the battle, being awarded the honor of the Cross of the Order of Golden Crosses. Following the war, Büchel, at the recommendation of Ali Pasha, served as a military instructor in the army of the Ottoman Empire, during which time he rose to the rank of colonel. As a Christian, this was the highest rank he could attain, and while he was offered the rank of general if he converted to Islam, he declined and resigned from his post, later returning to Germany. There is some evidence that he was awarded the title of Pasha while an instructor.

Move to the United States 
In late 1845, Büchel emigrated with the Adelsverein to the Republic of Texas (which shortly thereafter was admitted to the United States as the state of Texas), where he settled in the town of Indianola and dropped the umlaut from his last name, which became Buchel. His emigration from Germany may have been due to his killing of a man in a duel, as Buchel had a reputation for dueling. In May 1846, after U.S. Army General Zachary Taylor called for volunteers to fight in the Mexican–American War, Buchel raised a company in the First Regiment of Texas Foot Rifles. Buchel would serve as the company's captain and was later promoted to the rank of major. During the Battle of Buena Vista, Buchel served as Taylor's aide-de-camp, and he was later recognized for his bravery during the battle. Following the war, U.S. President Franklin Pierce named Buchel as the customs collector for Port Lavaca, Texas, and Buchel also engaged in business dealings in Corpus Christi. During the Crimean War, Buchel led a company, and during the Cortina Troubles in 1859, Buchel organized volunteers in Indianola, though they never saw military action.

American Civil War 
At the beginning of the American Civil War, Buchel sided with the Confederate States of America and joined the Texas Militia. By late 1861, Buchel was promoted to lieutenant colonel in the Third Texas Infantry (also known as Luckett's regiment) and was stationed in South Texas. However, in 1863, Buchel became the colonel for the First Texas Cavalry Regiment and participated in military action along the Texas Gulf Coast, patrolling the land between the San Bernard River and the Caney Creek. The regiment was later relocated to Louisiana due to the possibility of an American invasion of Texas through that state. In early 1864, Buchel was appointed as a brigadier general, though this appointment was never confirmed. On April 9, 1864, Buchel led his troops in the Battle of Pleasant Hill, during which he was mortally wounded. He was taken to nearby Mansfield, Louisiana, where he died several days later on April 15. Buchel was initially buried in Mansfield, but later a detachment from his regiment relocated his remains to the Texas State Cemetery in the state's capital of Austin. A memorial was held at the cemetery and a eulogy was given by Texas Lieutenant Governor Fletcher Stockdale.

Legacy 

Buchel was not married and had no heirs at the time of his death. At his burial site, the state of Texas erected a large stone memorial. In 1887, the Texas Legislature passed an act creating Buchel County in the western portion of the state, named in his honor. However, the county was never formally organized and by 1897, it was absorbed into Brewster County. Writing on Buchel in 1940, historian Ella Lonn said the following: "He was described as a quiet, unassuming man, and though apparently a secessionist, not nearly so violent as his superior, Luckett. A citizen of the Confederacy but a soldier of fortune if ever there was one!" In 1965, the University of Texas at Austin acquired a number of historical documents pertaining to Buchel as part of an 800-document collection.

Notes

References

External links 

 

1813 births
1864 deaths
American military personnel of the Mexican–American War
Confederate States Army officers
Foreign Confederate military personnel
German emigrants to the United States
German knights
Military personnel of the First Carlist War
Officers of the French Foreign Legion
Pashas
Turkish Army officers
Confederate States of America military personnel killed in the American Civil War